A lord-lieutenant is the British monarch's personal representative in each lieutenancy area of the United Kingdom. Historically, each lieutenant was responsible for organising the county's militia. In 1871, the lieutenant's responsibility over the local militia was removed. However, it was not until 1921 that they formally lost the right to call upon able-bodied men to fight when needed.

Lord-lieutenant is now an honorary titular position usually awarded to a retired notable person in the county.

Origins

England and Wales
Lieutenants were first appointed to a number of English counties by King Henry VIII in the 1540s, when the military functions of the sheriffs were handed over to them. Each lieutenant raised and was responsible for the efficiency of the local militia units of his county, and afterwards of the yeomanry and volunteers. He was commander of these forces, whose officers he appointed. These commissions were originally of temporary duration, and only when the situation required the local militia to be specially supervised and well prepared; often when invasion by Scotland or France might be expected.

Lieutenancies soon became more organised, probably in the reign of Henry's successor King Edward VI, their establishment being approved by the English parliament in 1550. However, it was not until the threat of invasion by the forces of Spain in 1585 that lieutenants were appointed to all counties and counties corporate and became in effect permanent. Although some counties were left without lieutenants during the 1590s, following the defeat of the Spanish Armada, the office continued to exist, and was retained by King James I even after the end of the Anglo-Spanish War.

The office of lieutenant was abolished under the Commonwealth, but was re-established following the Restoration under the City of London Militia Act 1662, which declared that:

Although not explicitly stated, from that date lieutenants were appointed to "counties at large", with their jurisdiction including the counties corporate within the parent county. For example, lieutenants of Devon in the seventeenth and eighteenth centuries appointed deputy lieutenants to the City of Exeter, and were sometimes described as the "Lieutenant of Devon and Exeter". The one exception was Haverfordwest, to which a lieutenant continued to be appointed until 1974. The origin of this anomaly may have lain in the former palatine status of Pembrokeshire.

The official title of the office at this time was His or Her Majesty's "Lieutenant for the county of x", but, as almost all office-holders were peers of the realm, they were referred to as "Lord-Lieutenant".

The City of London was uniquely given a commission of lieutenancy, and was exempt from the authority of the lieutenant of Middlesex. The Constable of the Tower of London and the Warden of the Cinque Ports were ex officio lieutenants for the Tower Hamlets and the Cinque Ports respectively, which were treated as counties in legislation regarding lieutenancy and militia affairs.

Ireland
In the counties of Ireland, the officer in charge of the county militia was called "Lieutenant" until James II and "Governor" thereafter. There might be up to three governors in one county. Responsibility for recommending county magistrates lay with the custos rotulorum. The Custos Rotulorum (Ireland) Act 1831 cancelled the commissions of the Governors, transferred the militia and county magistrate functions to the (re-)established office of Lieutenant (appointed by letters patent and styled "Lord Lieutenant"), and empowered the Lord Lieutenant of Ireland to appoint Deputy Lieutenants. In the Republic of Ireland no Lord Lieutenants have been appointed since the creation of the Irish Free State in 1922, and all relevant statutes have been repealed.

Northern Ireland
In 1921, with the establishment of Northern Ireland, lord lieutenants continued to be appointed through the Governor of Northern Ireland to the six counties and the two county boroughs of Derry and Belfast. Whereas in 1973 the counties and county boroughs were abolished as local government units, lord-lieutenants are now appointed directly by the King to "counties and county boroughs ... as defined for local government purposes immediately before 1 October 1973".

Scotland

Although Colin, Earl of Balcarres was appointed Lord Lieutenant of Fife in 1688, and lieutenants were appointed to a few counties from about 1715, it was not until 1794 that permanent lieutenancies were established by royal warrant. By the Militia Act 1797, the lieutenants appointed "for the Counties, Stewartries, Cities, and Places" were given powers to raise and command county militia units.

The Lord Provosts of Edinburgh, Glasgow, Aberdeen, and Dundee are, by virtue of office, also the lord-lieutenant of their respective city.

While in their lieutenancies, lord-lieutenants are among the few individuals in Scotland officially permitted to fly the banner of the Royal Arms of Scotland, or "The Lion Rampant" as it is more commonly known.

19th century
The Militia Act 1802 provided for the appointment of lieutenants to "Lieutenants for the Counties, Ridings, and Places" in England and Wales, and gave them command of the county militia. In the case of towns or cities which were counties of themselves, the "chief magistrate" (meaning the mayor, chief bailiff or other head of the corporation) had the authority to appoint deputy lieutenants in the absence of an appointment of a lieutenant by the crown. 
  
The Regulation of the Forces Act 1871 removed the lieutenant as head of the county militia, as the jurisdiction, duties and command exercised by the lieutenant were revested in the crown, but the power of recommending for first appointments was reserved to the lieutenant.

The Militia Act 1882 revested the jurisdiction of the lieutenants in the crown.

The lieutenancies were reestablished on a new basis by Section 29 of the 1882 Act which stated that "Her Majesty shall from time to time appoint lieutenants for the several counties in the United Kingdom". Counties for lieutenancy purposes were also redefined as "a county at large, with the exception that each riding of the county of York shall be a separate county". The text of the letters patent appointing lieutenants under the act stated they were to be:

This was a formal recognition of the situation that had existed since 1662 that the lieutenancies for the majority of counties corporate in England were held jointly with their associated county—for example a lieutenant was now appointed for "the County of Gloucester, and the City and County of Gloucester, and the City and County of City of Bristol".

Haverfordwest was permitted to retain a lieutenant while the Tower Hamlets and Cinque Ports were to continue to be regarded as counties for lieutenancy purposes.

From 1889 lieutenancy counties in England and Wales were to correspond to groupings of administrative counties and county boroughs established by the Local Government Act 1888. The creation of a new County of London also led to the ending of the Tower Hamlets lieutenancy. The Act also extinguished the lieutenancy of the Cinque Ports.

Section 69 of the Local Government (Ireland) Act 1898 realigned the lieutenancy counties with the new administrative counties created by the Act. The one exception was County Tipperary, which although administered by two county councils, was to remain united for lieutenancy. In contrast to the legislation in England and Wales, each county borough was to have its own lieutenant, and those counties corporate not made county boroughs were abolished. The effect of this was to create a lieutenant for the county boroughs of Belfast and Londonderry, and to abolish those for the city of Kilkenny, borough of Drogheda and town of Galway.

The office of lieutenant was honorary and held during the royal pleasure, but virtually for life. Appointment to the office is by letters-patent under the great seal. Usually, though not necessarily, the person appointed lieutenant was also appointed custos rotulorum or keeper of the rolls. Appointments to the county's bench of magistrates were usually made on the recommendation of the lieutenant.

20th century

The Territorial and Reserve Forces Act 1907 established county territorial force associations, of which the lieutenant was to be head, styled president of the county association. It restated the combination of counties and counties corporate as lieutenancy counties.

In 1921, with the establishment of Northern Ireland, lieutenants continued to be appointed through the Governor of Northern Ireland to the six counties and two county boroughs. The creation of the Irish Free State in the following year saw the remaining county lieutenancies in Ireland abolished. In 1973 the counties and county boroughs were abolished as local government units in Northern Ireland, and lord-lieutenants are now appointed directly by the sovereign to "counties and county boroughs... as defined for local government purposes immediately before 1 October 1973". In 1975 the term lord-lieutenant officially replaced that of lieutenant.

Local government reform in England in 1965 led to the appointment of lieutenants to Greater London and Huntingdon and Peterborough, and the abolition of those of the counties of London, Middlesex and Huntingdon.

A more fundamental reform of local government throughout England and Wales (outside Greater London) created a new structure of metropolitan, non-metropolitan and Welsh counties in 1974. Section 218 of the Local Government Act 1972 that established the new system stated: "Her Majesty shall appoint a lord-lieutenant for each county in England and Wales and for Greater London..." The Act appears to be the first statutory use of the term "lord-lieutenant" for lieutenants to counties.

Existing lord lieutenants were assigned to one of the corresponding new counties wherever possible. Where this could not be done, the existing office-holder became a lieutenant of a county, junior to the lord-lieutenant.  For example, the Lord Lieutenant of Montgomeryshire was appointed Lord Lieutenant of Powys, with those of Breconshire and Radnorshire each being designated as simply "Lieutenant of Powys". This measure was temporary, and no lieutenants have been appointed in this way since 1974, although the power still exists.

In 1975 counties ceased to be used for local government purposes in Scotland. The Local Government (Scotland) Act 1973 replaced the counties with regions, and each region was to have one or more lord-lieutenants appointed. The areas to which they were appointed approximated to the counties and were based and were defined in terms of the new local government districts.

Present day

In 1996 Scottish regions and districts were abolished on further local government reorganisation, and since that date lord-lieutenants have been appointed to "lieutenancy areas", in most places roughly equivalent to the historic Scottish counties.

Partial reform of local government in England since 1995 has led to the creation of so-called "ceremonial counties" to which lord-lieutenants are now appointed. The Lieutenancies Act 1997 is the most recent piece of primary legislation dealing with lieutenancies in England and includes the definitive list of the current areas used. Ceremonial counties may comprise combinations of county council areas and unitary authority areas, or even parts of them.

Since the local government re-organisation of 1996 in Wales, lord-lieutenants are now appointed to "preserved counties", i.e. the counties used for administrative purposes from 1974 to 1996.

The City of London was unaffected by changes introduced since 1882. It has a Commission of Lieutenancy rather than a single lord-lieutenant. The head of the commission is the Lord Mayor of the City of London.

Duties
Lord-lieutenants are the monarch's representatives in their respective lieutenancies. It is their foremost duty to uphold the dignity of the Crown, and in so doing they seek to promote a spirit of co-operation and good atmosphere through the time they give to voluntary and benevolent organisations and through the interest they take in the business and social life of their counties.

The modern responsibilities of lord-lieutenants include:
 Arranging visits of members of the royal family and escorting royal visitors;
 Presenting medals and awards on behalf of the sovereign, and advising on honours nominations;
 Participating in civic, voluntary and social activities within the lieutenancy;
 Acting as liaison with local units of the Royal Navy, Royal Marines, Army, Royal Air Force and their associated cadet forces;
 Leading the local magistracy as chairman of the Advisory Committee on Justices of the Peace; and
 Chairing the local Advisory Committee for the Appointment of the General Commissioners of Income Tax, a tribunal which hears appeals against decisions made by the HM Revenue and Customs on a variety of different tax-related matters.

As the sovereign's representative in his or her county, a lord-lieutenant remains non-political and may not hold office in any political party. They are appointed for life, although the customary age of retirement is 75 and the sovereign may remove them.

Deputies
Each lord-lieutenant is supported by a vice lord-lieutenant and deputy lieutenants that he or she appoints. The vice lord-lieutenant takes over when the lord-lieutenant is abroad, ill, or otherwise incapacitated. The lord-lieutenant appoints between thirty and forty deputy lieutenants depending on the county's population.

Remuneration
They are unpaid, but receive minimal allowances for secretarial help, mileage allowance and a driver. Male lord-lieutenants receive an allowance for the ceremonial uniform, worn when receiving members of the Royal Family and on other formal occasions. There is no uniform for a female lord-lieutenant, but there is a badge which can be worn on ceremonial occasions.

Uniform

Since at least the 18th century, a military-style uniform has been worn by lord-lieutenants (appropriate to the military origins of the post). Since 1831 this has been analogous to the uniform worn by a general staff officer, but with silver lace in place of the gold worn by regular officers. Over time, the design of the uniform changed in line with changes made to army uniform.

At present, it is a dark blue uniform in the style of a General Officer's Army No. 1 dress (but with buttons, epaulettes, sash, etc. in silver rather than gold). A cap is worn, as well as a sword with a steel scabbard. The badge used on the uniform varies depending on where the lieutenant's county is situated – a rose is worn in England, shamrocks in Northern Ireland, a thistle in Scotland and Prince-of-Wales feathers in Wales. On the whole, the lord-lieutenant's insignia resemble a Lieutenant-General of the British Army.

The uniform for a vice lord-lieutenant and for deputy lieutenants is of a similar style, but with features to distinguish it from that of a lord-lieutenant – on shoulder boards, no crown above the national symbol (rose, shamrocks or thistle); blue cord instead of silver on the red collar patches (deputy lieutenants have a simple grey stripe); and only a single row of gold braid around the peak of the cap (deputy lieutenants have no oak leaf but simple gold tape). In addition, deputy lieutenants wear narrower shoulder boards than their superiors, and the red cap band is horizontally divided by a small grey stripe. The vice lord-lieutenant's dress resembles that of a former Brigadier-General of the British Army, while a deputy lieutenant's dress resembles that of a field officer.

Badge

In 1975 a badge was provided for female lord-lieutenants to wear as an optional alternative to the uniform. It consists of an enamel version of the uniform cap badge topped by a jewelled crown, suspended from a ribbon of the same colour as the uniform sash.

Lord Lieutenant of Ireland
The Lord Lieutenant of Ireland was the head of the British administration in Ireland until the foundation of the Irish Free State in 1922.

Forms of address for lord-lieutenants 

Written: '(Title and name), His Majesty's Lord-Lieutenant'
Salutation: 'Dear Lord-Lieutenant'
In a speech: 'My Lord-Lieutenant'
In conversation: '(Title and name)' or 'Lord-Lieutenant'.
Plural: 'Lord-lieutenants', although the historic form of 'Lords-Lieutenant' frequently appears.

Colonial equivalents
In the colonies of the English Empire, and subsequently the British Empire, the duties of a lord-lieutenant were generally performed by the commander-in-chief or the governor. Both offices may have been occupied by the same person.

By way of an example, this is still the case in Britain's second, and oldest remaining, colony, Bermuda, where the Royal Navy's headquarters, main base, and dockyard for the North America and West Indies Station was established following independence of the United States of America. The colony had raised militia and volunteer forces since official settlement in 1612 (with a troop-of-horse added later), and a small force of regular infantry from 1701 to 1783. Bermuda became an Imperial fortress (along with Halifax, Nova Scotia, Gibraltar, and Malta), a large regular army garrison was built up after 1794, and the reserve forces faded away following the conclusion of the American War of 1812 as the local government lost interest in paying for their upkeep. From this point until the 1960s, governors were almost exclusively senior British Army officers (particularly from the Royal Artillery or Royal Engineers) who were also military Commanders-in-Chief (and initially also vice admirals) of the regular military forces stationed in the colony and not simply the reserves. Attempts to rekindle the militia without a Militia Act or funds from the colonial government were made throughout the century under the authorisation of the Governor and Commander-in-Chief, but none proved lasting. The colonial government was finally compelled to raise militia and volunteer forces (the Bermuda Militia Artillery and the Bermuda Volunteer Rifle Corps) by act in the 1890s (the Bermuda Cadet Corps, Bermuda Volunteer Engineers, and Bermuda Militia Infantry were added at later dates), and these fell under the Governor and Commander-in-Chief, as well as under operational control of his junior, the brigadier in charge of the Bermuda Command (or Bermuda Garrison), which included the regular as well as the part-time military (as opposed to naval) forces in the colony. Although the Royal Naval and the regular army establishments have been withdrawn from Bermuda, the Governor of Bermuda remains the Commander-in-Chief (though most recent office holders have not been career army officers) of the Royal Bermuda Regiment (a 1965 amalgam of the BMA and BVRC, which had both been reorganised in line with the Territorial Army after the First World War).

Approximate equivalents in other countries
In France and Italy, the role of Prefect (préfet in French, prefetto in Italian) is different from that of lord-lieutenant, as the regional and departmental prefects of France are responsible for delivering as well as control functions of public services. Similarly to a lord-lieutenant, in Portugal, a representative of the Republic (representante da República in Portuguese) is the personal representative of the Head of State in each of the two autonomous regions of the country, having a limited political role, besides the ceremonial one. In Sweden landshövding and Norway fylkesmann, the regional governor is responsible for administrative control functions of services delivered and decisions made by local and county municipalities, as well as representing the king in the region. In the Netherlands, King's Commissioners (Commissaris van de Koning in Dutch) are appointed by the monarch, but unlike a lord-lieutenant, belong to a political party.

See also
Deputy lieutenant
Ceremonial counties of England
High sheriff
King's Commissioner
Lieutenancy areas of Scotland
Preserved counties of Wales
List of lord lieutenants in the United Kingdom

Notes

External links

Royal.gov.uk: Official Royal Lord-Lieutenants website
Parliamentary Archives, Papers of the Association of Lord-Lieutenants of Counties

 01
.02
Ceremonial officers in the United Kingdom
Gubernatorial titles

Titles of national or ethnic leadership